Mansfield Summit High School is a size 5A secondary school located in Arlington, Texas, and is part of the Mansfield Independent School District. The school serves a portion of Arlington.

The school first opened in Fall of 2002. , the school principal is Matthew Brown. The school mascot is the Jaguar. Mansfield Summit High School enrolls approximately 2,500 students annually. The 2006–2007 year saw an increase in these numbers to about 2,850 students. , Summit enrolls fewer students due to the opening of Mansfield Legacy High School. , Summit's Class of 2016 has an enrollment of 448 students.

School history 

The Mansfield school district was a one high school district for many years. In 1998, the current Summit High School building was opened on Turner-Warnell Road in Arlington. It was originally the north campus center housing mainly juniors and seniors in the entire district. Mansfield High School was composed of two campuses – North and South Campus; in 2002, students who would be seniors in the 2002–2003 school year had the option to choose which school they would graduate from. The Mansfield High School name moved to a new building, while the old North Campus building became the site for Summit High School. The South Campus became Brooks Wester Middle School.

In 2004, Mansfield Timberview High School opened on Texas Highway 360 as Summit approached capacity. Again in 2007, another school opened, named Mansfield Legacy High School. Once again, students had the choice to pick which school they wished to attend. MISD now has five high schools: Mansfield High, Summit High, Timberview High, Legacy High, and Lake Ridge High built and opened in 2012. It also has a high school facility, Ben Barber Career and Technology Academy, in which students from the high schools are bused to and from their home campuses.

Alumni 

John Chiles, 2007. NFL wide receiver for the Chicago Bears.
Moses Ehambe, 2004. Professional basketball player.
Quinn Sharp, 2008. Placekicker for the Saskatchewan Roughriders.
Vernon Scott, 2016. Safety for the Green Bay Packers
Myles Adams, 2016. Defensive End for the Seattle Seahawks

Feeder patterns 
The following elementary schools feed into Mansfield Summit High School:
 Anderson
 Davis
 Harmon
 Holt (partial)
 Morris

The following intermediate schools feed into Mansfield Summit High School:
 Cross Timbers (partial)
 Asa Low (partial)

The following middle schools feed into Mansfield Summit High School:
 Howard (partial)
 Wester (partial)

References

External links 
 Mansfield Summit band website
 Mansfield Summit High School Website
 Mansfield Independent School District Website

Educational institutions established in 2002
High schools in Arlington, Texas
Public high schools in Tarrant County, Texas
Mansfield Independent School District high schools
2002 establishments in Texas